The Atlanta Board of Education is the governing body of Atlanta Public Schools. The board has nine members: six are elected by geographical districts and three are elected citywide. All serve four-year terms.

While the board establishes and approves policies that govern the school system, the day-to-day administration of the school district is the responsibility of the Superintendent, who is appointed by the board. (Former) Superintendent Former superintendent Meria Carstarphen was unanimously chosen by the Board of Education in April 2014.)

Members
 Katie Howard (District 1)
 Arreta L. Baldon (District 2, Vice Chair)
 Michelle D. Olympiadis (District 3)
 Jennifer McDonald (District 4)
 Erika Y. Mitchell (District 5)
 Eshe' P. Collins (District 6, Chair)
 Tamara Jones (at-large, Seat 7)
 Cynthia Briscoe Brown (at-large, Seat 8)
 Jessica Johnson (at-large, Seat 9)

Compensation
Board members are paid an annual salary of $22,500 ($24,500 for the Chair and $23,500 for the Vice Chair). Compensation increased to $22,500 ($24,500 for the Chair and $23,500 for the Vice Chair) on January 1, 2022.

Notable former members 
 Eugene Mitchell, former president of the Atlanta Board of Education

References

Education in Atlanta